Juraj Bača (born 17 March 1977 in Komárno) is a Slovak sprint canoeist who competed from 1998 to 2005. Competing in two Summer Olympics, he won a bronze medal in the K-4 1000 m event at Athens in 2004.

Bača also won seven medals at the ICF Canoe Sprint World Championships with six golds (K-2 500 m: 1998, K-2 1000 m: 1999, K-4 500 m: 2002, 2003; K-4 1000 m: 2002, 2003) and one bronze (K-4 500 m: 2001).

After retiring from competition, Bača now works as a kayak coach. In autumn 2006 he appeared on the celebrity TV dance competition Let's Dance.

Bača was a member of the ŠKP Bratislava club. He is 186 cm (6'1") tall and raced at 86 kg (189 lbs).

References

External links 
 
 
 

1977 births
Canoeists at the 2000 Summer Olympics
Canoeists at the 2004 Summer Olympics
Living people
Olympic canoeists of Slovakia
Olympic bronze medalists for Slovakia
Slovak male canoeists
Olympic medalists in canoeing
ICF Canoe Sprint World Championships medalists in kayak
Medalists at the 2004 Summer Olympics
Sportspeople from Komárno